{{DISPLAYTITLE:C4H8O3}}
The molecular formula C4H8O3 may refer to:

Hydroxybutyric acids:
 2-Hydroxybutyric acid (alpha-hydroxybutyric acid)
 beta-Hydroxybutyric acid (3-hydroxybutyric acid)
 gamma-Hydroxybutyric acid (4-hydroxybutyric acid, GHB)
 Hydroxyisobutyric acids
 2-Hydroxyisobutyric acid
 3-Hydroxyisobutyric acid
 Methyl lactate